Shekinah Munanga (born 18 December 1997) is a Congolese basketball player, who currently plays for Etoile Angers Basket of the French Nationale Masculine 1. Previously, he played for AS Monaco Basket of the LNB Pro A. He mainly played for the Monaco Espoirs, the team of the club's youth section. In April 2018, he declared for the 2018 NBA draft. In the 2016–17 season, Munanga made his debut in the French professional first tier LNB Pro A with Limoges CSP.

References

1997 births
Basketball players from Kinshasa
AS Monaco Basket players
Limoges CSP players
Power forwards (basketball)
Expatriate basketball people in Monaco
Living people